Camila Benedicto (born 7 December 1977) is a Brazilian equestrian. She competed in two events at the 2008 Summer Olympics.

References

External links
 

1977 births
Living people
Brazilian female equestrians
Olympic equestrians of Brazil
Equestrians at the 2008 Summer Olympics
Sportspeople from São Paulo